Wildflower is the debut studio album by season ten American Idol runner-up Lauren Alaina. The album was released by Mercury Nashville. on October 11, 2011 in the United States. The album's first single, "Like My Mother Does", reached the Top 40 on the Billboard Hot Country Songs chart. Wildflower debuted at number five on the US Billboard 200 chart, making Alaina the youngest female artist to debut that high since LeAnn Rimes' debut album, Blue, fifteen years prior.

Reception

Wildflower received positive reviews from music critics. At Metacritic, which assigns a normalized rating out of 100 to reviews from mainstream critics, the album received an average score of 72, based on 4 reviews, which indicates "generally favorable reviews". AllMusic writer Stephen Thomas Erlewine gave the album 3 stars out of 5 and wrote: "Byron Gallimore, who previously produced Sugarland and Faith Hill, gives Wildflower an appealing gloss that helps disguise the ordinariness of the material along with any of Alaina's shortcomings, and that slickness serves Wildflower well, making it a much more enjoyable piece of product than McCreery's Clear as Day". The New York Times gave a very positive review to the album and said: "It works, not only because Ms. Alaina has a big voice, but also because she doesn't portray herself as an aw-shucks beginner. She's skipped that step, and rightly so". Melissa Maerz of Entertainment Weekly was also positive on the album and gave it a "B" and said: "On Wildflower, she captures the restless spirit of small-town girls who get grounded for French-kissing the boy next door". Jessica Nicholson of Country Weekly gave the album 3 and half stars out of 5 and noted: "Despite the album's title, she plays it safe rather than wild".

Track listing

Personnel
 Lauren Alaina - lead vocals
 Charlie Bisharat - fiddle
 Perry Coleman - background vocals
 Dan Dugmore - dobro, steel guitar
 Stuart Duncan - fiddle, mandolin
 Shannon Forrest - drums, percussion
 Larry Franklin - fiddle
 Paul Franklin - steel guitar
 Byron Gallimore - electric guitar, keyboards
 Lisa Gregg - background vocals
 Tania Hancheroff - background vocals
 Troy Lancaster - acoustic guitar, electric guitar
 Pat McGrath - banjo, acoustic guitar, resonator guitar, mandolin
 Jerry McPherson - electric guitar
 Kenny LeMasters - steel guitar
 Brent Mason - electric guitar
 Jamie Muhoberac - keyboards
 Steve Nathan - keyboards, organ, piano
 Jeannette Olsson - background vocals
 Michael Thompson - electric guitar
 Lonnie Wilson - drums, drum loops, percussion
 Glenn Worf - bass guitar
 Craig Young - bass guitar
 Chris "Tek" O'Ryan - sound engineer

Chart performance
The album debuted at No. 5 on the Billboard 200 with 69,000 copies sold.  It has sold 303,000 copies in the United States as of January 2013.

Weekly charts

Year-end charts

References

External links

2011 debut albums
Lauren Alaina albums
Mercury Nashville albums
19 Recordings albums
Interscope Records albums
Interscope Geffen A&M Records albums